Mohammad Boota (born 5 January 1983) is a Pakistani-born cricketer who plays for the United Arab Emirates national cricket team. He made his List A debut for the United Arab Emirates against Nepal in the 2015–17 ICC World Cricket League Championship on 6 December 2017.

In January 2018, he was named in the United Arab Emirates One Day International (ODI) squad for the tri-series against Ireland and Scotland. He made his ODI debut against Ireland in the tri-series on 11 January 2018. Later the same month, he was named in the United Arab Emirates's squad for the 2018 ICC World Cricket League Division Two tournament.

In December 2018, he was named in the United Arab Emirates' team for the 2018 ACC Emerging Teams Asia Cup. In January 2019, he was named in the United Arab Emirates' Twenty20 International (T20I) squad for their series against Nepal. He made his T20I debut for the United Arab Emirates against Nepal on 31 January 2019.

In September 2019, he was named in the United Arab Emirates' squad for the 2019 ICC T20 World Cup Qualifier tournament in the UAE. In December 2020, he was one of ten cricketers to be awarded with a year-long full-time contract by the Emirates Cricket Board.

References

External links
 

1983 births
Living people
Emirati cricketers
United Arab Emirates One Day International cricketers
United Arab Emirates Twenty20 International cricketers
Cricketers from Sialkot
Pakistani emigrants to the United Arab Emirates
Pakistani expatriate sportspeople in the United Arab Emirates